The 2000 New York Jets season was the 41st season for the team, and the 31st in the National Football League. It was also their first under the ownership of Woody and Christopher Johnson, who purchased the team in January 2000 from the estate of former owner Leon Hess.

The team tried to improve upon its 8–8 record from 1999 under new head coach Al Groh, who became the successor for Bill Parcells after Bill Belichick abruptly resigned to take the same position with the New England Patriots. Although they managed to finish one game better than they had in 1999, their 9–7 record (including three losses to close the year) was not enough to make the playoffs.

Shortly after the season ended, Groh resigned as coach to take the head coaching position at the University of Virginia, his alma mater. 

Shortly after that, Parcells stepped down as Director of Football Operations and retired from football. Like his previous retirement, it proved to be temporary: Parcells was back in the NFL in 2003 as the head coach of the Dallas Cowboys, where he’d remain until 2006.

Offseason

NFL draft

Personnel

Staff/coaches

Roster

Regular season

Schedule 
The Jets were ranked 12th in the NFL in total offense and finished tied with Philadelphia for 10th in total defense.

Standings

Best performances 
 Curtis Martin, Week 14, 203 Rushing Yards vs. Indianapolis (Franchise Record)
 Richie Anderson, Week 8, 109 Rushing Yards vs. Miami
 Richie Anderson, Week 15, 103 Rushing Yards vs. Oakland
 Wayne Chrebet, Week 8, 104 Receiving Yards vs. Miami
 Wayne Chrebet, Week 11, 140 Receiving Yards vs. Indianapolis
 Laveranues Coles, Week 9, 131 Receiving Yards vs. Buffalo
 Vinny Testaverde, Week 8, 378 Passing Yards vs. Miami Dolphins
 Vinny Testaverde, Week 17, 481 Passing Yards vs. Baltimore Ravens
 Dedric Ward, Week 1, 104 Receiving Yards vs. Green Bay
 Dedric Ward, Week 2, 100 Receiving Yards vs. New England

Statistics 
 NFL leader, passes attempted, 637 passes
 NFL leader (tied), times sacked, 20

Awards and records 
 Bryan Cox, AFC Defensive Player of the Week, week 14
 Mo Lewis, AFC Defensive Player of the Week, week 7
 Curtis Martin, AFC Offensive Player of the Month, September

See also 
 The Monday Night Miracle (Week 8 game)

References

External links 
 2000 team stats

New York Jets seasons
New York Jets
New York Jets season
20th century in East Rutherford, New Jersey
Meadowlands Sports Complex